Federal Highway 221 (Carretera Federal 221) is a Federal Highway of Mexico. It stretches from Nuevo Coahuila and junctions with Federal Highway 186, near Ojo de Agua, Campeche.

References

221